Verjaluys Karapeti Mirijanyan (22 December 1916 - 3 February 1992) — Armenian actress and Honored Artist of Armenia. She was known for The Song of the Old Days, A Bride from the North, and Panos the Clumsy.

References

External links

1916 births
Armenian film actresses
20th-century Armenian actresses
1992 deaths
People from Iğdır
Soviet Armenians
Soviet actresses